The 1904 United States presidential election in Wyoming took place on November 8, 1904, as part of the 1904 United States presidential election. State voters chose three representatives, or electors, to the Electoral College, who voted for president and vice president.

Wyoming was won by the 26th and sitting President of the United States Theodore Roosevelt (R–New York), who assumed office after the assassination of William McKinley, running with the 26th Vice President of the United States Charles W. Fairbanks. Roosevelt and Fairbanks won with 66.72 percent of the popular vote against Chief Judge of the New York Court of Appeals Alton Parker (D–New York), running with Senator Henry Gassaway Davis, with 29.08 percent of the popular vote.

Results

Results by county

See also
 United States presidential elections in Wyoming

Notes

References

Wyoming
1904
1904 Wyoming elections